Kornhauser is a surname. Notable people with the name include:

Agata Kornhauser-Duda (born 1972), née Kornhauser, First Lady of Poland
Arthur Kornhauser (1896–1990), American industrial psychologist
Eddie Kornhauser (1918–2006), Australian property developer
Julian Kornhauser (born 1946), Polish poet and literary critic